The Opéra National de Lyon, marketed as Opéra de Lyon during the last decade, is an opera company in Lyon, based and performing mostly at the Opéra Nouvel, an 1831 theater that was modernized and architecturally transformed in 1993.

The inaugural performance of François-Adrien Boïeldieu's La Dame blanche was given on 1 July 1831. The Nineteenth and Twentieth Centuries saw some significant French premieres of major operas including Richard Wagner's Die Meistersinger in 1896, Giordano's Andrea Chénier in the following year, and Moussorgsky's Boris Godunov in 1913.  In addition, many world premieres such as Arnold Schoenberg's Erwartung (1967) have been presented.

In the years after the 1969 appointment of Louis Erlo as general director, many innovative productions and premieres of both French operas and Twentieth Century operas have been staged. Two significant French artists who have been associated with the Opéra in recent years are the stage director, Laurent Pelly, and the soprano, Natalie Dessay.

Past principal conductors at the company have included André Cluytens, John Eliot Gardiner, Kent Nagano, Louis Langrée, Iván Fischer, and Kazushi Ono. Since the start of the 2017–2018 season, the company's current principal conductor (chef permanent) of the company is Daniele Rustioni, whose appointment to the post was announced in March 2015. The current choirmaster of the company is Philip White, since 2015.

The company has an affiliated corps de ballet, Lyon Opera Ballet.  As well, the company has a children's choir, La Maîtrise (masterclass), was created in 1990 to form a top-level choir of young soloists. Since 1993, it has a status similar to other French musical schools.

The opera house

A first theater was built here by Soufflot during the 18th century. Nevertheless, the theatre soon became too small and the architects Chenavard and Pollet rebuilt a brand new one in a neo-classical style in 1830.

At the beginning of the 1980s, out of age and not meeting the needs any more, the Opera had to be renewed. A competition for architects was thus launched and won in 1986 by Jean Nouvel. The new Opera of Lyon was inaugurated in May 1993 and is now part of the international architectural heritage.
Outside the opera house, Nouvel only kept the outer walls. He also dug new underground levels and added a semi-cylindrical dome that is used by dancers.
On the opera house front wall, 8 muses have been kept in place (Uranie, the 9th one was removed to respect the symmetry of the building).

Principal conductors
 John Eliot Gardiner (1983–1988)
 Kent Nagano (1988–1998)
 Louis Langrée (1998–2000)
 Iván Fischer (2000–2003)
 Kazushi Ono (2008–2017)
 Daniele Rustioni (2017–present)

References

 Citations

 

 Other sources

External links
  
 Photos of the Nouvel Opera House

1st arrondissement of Lyon
French opera companies
Entertainment in Lyon
Musical groups established in 1983
Musical groups from Lyon
French companies established in 1983